The Polish Handball Association (ZPRP) is the national handball association in Poland.

ZPRP is a member of the European Handball Federation (EHF), the International Handball Federation (IHF) and the Polish Olympic Committee.

References

External links
  

Handball in Poland
Handball
Poland
Sports organizations established in 1928